Pudd'nhead Wilson is a lost 1916 American comedy silent film directed by Frank Reicher and written by Margaret Turnbull. The film stars Theodore Roberts, Alan Hale, Sr., Thomas Meighan, Florence Dagmar, Jane Wolfe and Ernest Joy. The film was released on January 31, 1916, by Paramount Pictures.

Plot
The film revolves around a murder mystery. The story takes place in the mid 19th century. A biracial nurse named Roxy (Jane Wolff) swaps her son with her master's son. That son grows up as Tom Driscoll, while the real Tom grows up as the slave known as Chambers. Rowena Cooper comes from the North and falls in love with Chambers. Chambers is accused of murder and the eccentric lawyer Pudd'nhead Wilson looks for details. He uses fingerprints to uncover the real killer, but during his investigation he figures out Chambers and Tom were switched as infants.

Cast 
Theodore Roberts as Pudd'nhead Wilson
Alan Hale, Sr. as Tom Driscoll
Thomas Meighan as Chambers
Florence Dagmar as Rowena Cooper
Jane Wolfe as Roxy 
Ernest Joy as Judge Driscoll
Gertrude Kellar as Mrs. Driscoll

References

External links 

 

1916 films
1910s English-language films
Silent American comedy films
1916 comedy films
Paramount Pictures films
Lost American films
Films based on works by Mark Twain
American black-and-white films
American silent feature films
Films based on American novels
1916 lost films
Lost comedy films
Films directed by Frank Reicher
1910s American films